Gutenbach is a river of Rhineland-Palatinate, Germany. It springs east of Schneebergerhof (part of Gerbach). It is a right tributary of the Appelbach in Oberhausen an der Appel.

See also
List of rivers of Rhineland-Palatinate

References

Rivers of Rhineland-Palatinate
Rivers of Germany